Bjarne Jørgensen (born 13 May 1933) is a Danish gymnast. He competed in eight events at the 1952 Summer Olympics.

References

1933 births
Living people
Danish male artistic gymnasts
Olympic gymnasts of Denmark
Gymnasts at the 1952 Summer Olympics
Sportspeople from Copenhagen